Amirali Nabavian (Persian: امیرعلی نبویان; born March 22, 1980) is an Iranian author, presenter, host and actor. He is best known for his books The Tales of Amirali trilogy and his presentation in television program Khandevaneh.

Early life
In his talk at TEDxTehran, he noted that what people hate may lead them to the true path of life.

Filmography

Film

Web

Television

 Radio Haft
 Footballism
 Nooshdaroo
 Sadbarg
 Khosha Shiraz

Bibliography
 The Tales of Amirali 1 (2012)
 The Tales of Amirali 2 (2012)
 The Tales of Amirali 3 (2014)
 City of Grief (2017)
 As If It Had Never Existed (2020)

References

1980 births
Living people
People from Amol
Iranian writers
Iranian male actors
Iranian television personalities